]
The Fokker Super Universal was an airliner produced in the United States in the late 1920s, an enlarged and improved version of the Fokker Universal, fitted with cantilever wings and an enclosed cockpit. It was subsequently also manufactured under license in Canada, and in Japan as the Nakajima-Fokker Super Universal and for the IJAAF as the Nakajima Ki-6 and later in the puppet state of Manchukuo as the Manshū Super Universal.

Design and development
The Super Universal was a conventional, high-wing cantilever monoplane with a fully enclosed flight deck and cabin and a fixed undercarriage. Improvements over its forerunner included an enclosed cockpit and a new wing that eliminated the requirement for struts, bringing it in line with the rest of Fokker's designs. The preceding Fokker Universal was built with an open cockpit but many were converted.

Construction was as per standard Fokker practice, with the wing being made almost entirely of wood with two main spars and light ribs covered in thin sheets of plywood. The fuselage was built up from welded steel tubes, largely cross-braced with wires. Fairings, the floor and an internal bulkhead separating the pilot from the cabin were wood. A triangular-shaped door gave the pilot access to the cabin. The tail was also built up from steel tubing but used no internal bracing. The main structural members were larger diameter tubes, while smaller tubes gave the structure a small degree of camber. The standard undercarriage consisted of a tailskid with divided main gear legs sprung with bungee cords and attached to the wings and the fuselage, but floats or skis could also be fitted.

Operational history
The Super Universal was received enthusiastically in the marketplace, selling better than any other of Fokker-America's designs (some 80 aircraft), and required the company to expand its factory space to meet demand. A further 15 aircraft were built by Canadian Vickers, and around 100 were built by Nakajima with some of these Japanese aircraft seeing military service as the Ki-6. The United States Navy also evaluated the Super Universal for military service, under the designation XJA-1, but decided not to purchase the type (the JA designation was later reused for the Noorduyn Norseman). The Fokker Universal was popular as a bush plane and many found their way into the Canadian north.

The first production Super Universal was named the Virginia by Richard E. Byrd and taken to the Antarctic in 1928. This aircraft was damaged after being ripped from its tiedowns and thrown backwards over one kilometre in winds estimated to have been at least 150 mph, and was abandoned, although Byrd subsequently revisited it to salvage useful parts.

For the operational history of the versions used by Japan and Manchukuo, see the Nakajima Ki-6 article.

The Fokker Super Universal which made up TWA fleet of airplanes were dealt a big blow, when one flying in good weather crashed near Bazaar, Kansas on March 31, 1931, with Knute Rockne, famous Notre Dame Football coach while en route to participate in the production of the film The Spirit of Notre Dame. Both pilots and all six passengers were killed.  A long, thorough and well-publicized investigation concluded that the Fokker, operated by a company of the newly-formed TWA, broke up in clear weather due to fatigue cracks in its famous cantilever stressed plywood wing, around where one of the engine mounting struts joined.

The Fokker Super Universal fleet was inspected and grounded after similar cracks were found in many examples, ruining the manufacturer's American reputation (the Dutch designer Anthony Fokker was then in business in Hasbrouck Heights, New Jersey). This resulted in a complete overhaul of standards for new transport aircraft and led to the use of all-metal construction in commercial aircraft such as the Boeing 247 and Douglas DC-2

Surviving aircraft
In 1998, a Super Universal originally used for mineral exploration in Canada's north was restored to airworthy condition in Manitoba, and after being flown for a few years was placed on display at the Western Canada Aviation Museum in 2005. Byrd's Fokker Universal was rediscovered by a New Zealand expedition in 1987 and the Antarctic Aviation Preservation Society intends to salvage and restore it.

Variants
XJA-1A Super Universal evaluated by the United States Navy
Nakajima Super Universal
 Civilian transport
Ki-6 (Army Type 95 Training Aircraft)
 Military transport for the IJAAF
Nakajima-Fokker Super Universal

Nakajima-Fokker Ambulance Aircraft

Nakajima Navy Fokker Reconnaissance Aircraft
Short designation C2N1 and C2N2
C2N1 (Navy land-based reconnaissance aircraft)
 Land-based recon and military transport for the IJN
C2N2 (Navy reconnaissance seaplane)
Land-based recon and military transport for the IJN
Manshū Super Universal
Civil and military transport built in Manchukuo (Manchuria)

Operators

Civil

Canadian Airways
Canadian Vickers
Northern Transportation Company
Starratt Airways
Western Canada Airways

SCADTA

Japan Air Transport

Manchukuo National Airways

 Coastal Air Freight
 Goodyear Tire and Rubber Company
Byrd Antarctic Expedition
Mid-Continent Air Express
Standard Air Lines
National Parks Airways
Universal Air Lines

 Union Airways

Military

Armada Argentina

Royal Canadian Air Force

Imperial Japanese Army Air Service
Imperial Japanese Navy Air Service

United States Navy

Specifications

References
Notes

Bibliography

 Dierikx, Marc. Fokker: A Transatlantic Biography. Washington, D.C.: Smithsonian Institution Press, 1997. .
 Molson, K.M. Pioneering in Canadian Air Transport. Winnipeg, Manitoba, Canada: James Richardson & Sons, Ltd., 1974. .
 Nevin, David. The Pathfinders (The Epic of Flight Series). Alexandria, Virginia: Time-Life Books, 1980. .
 Postma, Thijs. Fokker: Aircraft Builders to the World. London: Jane's, 1979. .
 Seagrave, Sterling. The Bush Pilots (The Epic of Flight Series). Alexandria, Virginia: Time-Life Books, 1983. .
 Taylor, Michael J. H. Jane's Encyclopedia of Aviation. London: Studio Editions, 1989. p. 410.
 World Aircraft Information Files. London: Bright Star Publishing, File 894, Sheet 44.

External links

 Antarctic Aviation Preservation Society
 Fokker Super Universal CF-AAM Returns to Yukon Territory
 Western Canada Aviation Museum

1920s United States airliners
Super Universal
Single-engined tractor aircraft
High-wing aircraft
Canadian Vickers aircraft
Nakajima aircraft
Aircraft first flown in 1928